NEVER is the third studio album by Japanese singer MIE. The album was released through CBS Sony on October 5, 1982. The title track, a Japanese-language cover of the Moving Pictures song from the Footloose soundtrack, peaked at No. 4 in Oricon's singles chart. "Never" was also used as the theme song for the TBS drama series .

The album was reissued on October 24, 2007 as NEVER -Special Edition-, with eight bonus tracks and a DVD.

Track listing 
Side A

Side B

Special Edition bonus tracks

Special Edition DVD
 "NEVER" / "Somebody"
 "Dakishimete -Sicilian Wind-"
 "Hungry"
 "Mega Madness"
 "Memory"
 "NEVER"
 "I Love How You Love Me"

References

External links

 
 

1984 albums
Mie albums
Japanese-language albums
Sony Music Entertainment Japan albums